Lisa Moro (born 22 June 1981) is an Australian gymnast. She competed in six events at the 1996 Summer Olympics.

References

1981 births
Living people
Australian female artistic gymnasts
Olympic gymnasts of Australia
Gymnasts at the 1996 Summer Olympics
Sportspeople from Melbourne
20th-century Australian women